August Kuusisto (18 December 1883, Puumala - 11 February 1972; surname until 1920 Kauranen) was a Finnish farmer and politician. He was a member of the Parliament of Finland from 1927 to 1929 and again from 1930 to 1945, representing the Social Democratic Party of Finland (SDP).

References

1883 births
1972 deaths
People from Puumala
People from Mikkeli Province (Grand Duchy of Finland)
Social Democratic Party of Finland politicians
Members of the Parliament of Finland (1927–29)
Members of the Parliament of Finland (1930–33)
Members of the Parliament of Finland (1933–36)
Members of the Parliament of Finland (1936–39)
Members of the Parliament of Finland (1939–45)
Finnish people of World War II